Kate del Castillo Negrete Trillo is a Mexican-American actress. At the age of 19, del Castillo became known for her lead role in the telenovela Muchachitas for Televisa in 1991. Afterwards, she continued her career in film and television in Latin America, playing the leading roles in telenovelas, including Alguna vez tendremos alas (1997), La Mentira (1998), Ramona (2000), and Bajo la misma piel (2003–04).

In 2011, del Castillo earned worldwide recognition for playing the lead role in the Telemundo series La Reina del Sur. In 2017, she went to star in the Netflix political drama series Ingobernable playing First Lady of Mexico Emilia Urquiza. Del Castillo made her Hollywood debut playing a female leading role in the 2007 drama film Under the Same Moon and later appeared in supporting roles in films No Good Deed (2014), The 33 (2015), El Chicano (2019), and Bad Boys for Life (2020).

Early life
 
Del Castillo was born in Mexico City, Mexico. She is the daughter of Kate Trillo Graham and Eric del Castillo, a legend of Mexican cinema and a soap opera actor himself. Del Castillo has two siblings: a sister, the journalist Verónica del Castillo, and a half-brother, Ponciano, from her father's side.

Career

Early works

Del Castillo made her acting debut in 1978 when she took part in a film called The Last Escape. She became well known in 1991 when she starred as Leticia in Muchachitas, a telenovela airing in several Latin American countries. The following year, she went to star in Mágica juventud. Her other leading roles in 1990s was in Azul (1996), long-running Alguna vez tendremos alas (1997), and La mentira. In 1995 she appeared in the music video "Fuego de Noche, Nieve de Día" by Ricky Martin.

In early 2000s, Del Castillo played the leading roles in telenovelas Ramona (2000), El derecho de nacer (2001) and Bajo la misma piel (2003-2004). In 2003, she made her American television debut playing a recurring role in the PBS drama series American Family starring Edward James Olmos and Sônia Braga. In 2009, she had a recurring role in the Showtime dark comedy-drama Weeds playing Pilar Zuazo, a powerful woman in Mexican politics. In 2002 and 2003, she embarked on an international tour alongside Argentine actor Saul Lisazo with the play Cartas de Amor (Love Letters). In 2005, she starred alongside Demián Bichir in the romantic comedy film American Visa. In 2006, Del Castillo starred in the film Bordertown, which became her first role in Hollywood. In 2007, she went to star in the drama film Under the Same Moon directed by Patricia Riggen. The film grossed $23.3 million against $1.7 million budget. She also starred in a number of independent movies, include The Black Pimpernel (2007) and Julia alongside Tilda Swinton.

In November 2007, Del Castillo was named one of the "Stars of the Year" and in 2011 one of the "25 most influential women" and "50 most beautiful" by People en Español magazine. In 2009, del Castillo was appointed Ambassador for the Mexican Commission on Human Rights and the following year she helped launch the Blue Heart Campaign in order to raise awareness and fight human trafficking.

2011–present 

In 2011, Del Castillo starred as Teresa "La Mexicana" Mendoza in the Telemundo telenovela La reina del sur based on a novel of the same name by Spanish author Arturo Pérez-Reverte, a role that skyrocketed her fame across Latin America. With a $10 million budget it is the second most expensive telenovela ever produced by Telemundo. The series later was renewed for a second season, that premiered in 2019. del Castillo continued her collaboration with Telemundo in 2015, starring in Duenos del Paraiso. The telenovela is inspired by the drug trade of Miami in the 1970s. She also appeared in a number of American television shows, include CSI: Miami, Grimm and Dallas. In 2015, she had a recurring role as Rogelio de la Vega's ex-wife in the CW comedy series, Jane the Virgin.

On November 20, 2015 Del Castillo launched a new brand of tequila named Honor del Castillo in association with the Vivanco Family. She serves as the spokesperson for the brand. Del Castillo has also appeared in advertising campaigns for L'Oréal and Ford.

In 2012, Del Castillo starred in the Mexican film Colosio: El asesinato, which centers around the assassination of the Mexican presidential candidate Luis Donaldo Colosio. The following year, she starred in the American prison drama film K-11. In later years, Del Castillo appeared in many American movies, including playing Idris Elba's ex in the 2014 thriller No Good Deed, Antonio Banderas' wife in the disaster-survival drama The 33, All About Nina (2018), El Chicano (2019), and Bad Boys for Life (2020). In 2017, she went to star in the Netflix political thriller series, Ingobernable playing the fictional First Lady of Mexico, Emilia Urquiza. The second season premiered in 2018.

In 2019, del Castillo made her off-Broadway debut in the Audible Theater production of Isaac Gomez's play The Way She Spoke. The performance earned her Drama Desk, Drama League, and Lucille Lortel Award for Outstanding Lead Actress in a Play nominations, making her the first Mexican actress to be nominated for three theatre awards in New York.

In 2022, del Castillo starred in the Peacock comedy-drama series, 'Til Jail Do Us Part. In 2023, she is set to star and produce Volver a caer, a six-part miniseries that a modern take in Spanish on Leo Tolstoy's Anna Karenina.

Personal life
One of del Castillo's first known romantic relations was with Emilio Azcárraga Jean, son of media mogul Emilio Azcárraga Milmo, and now CEO of the largest mass media company in Latin America, the Televisa Group. On February 3, 2001, she married football player Luis García. The marriage was dissolved on September 1, 2004. In August 2009, del Castillo married Aarón Díaz in a Las Vegas ceremony. On July 26, 2011, it was announced that Kate and Díaz were separating. Del Castillo was briefly romantically connected with Sean Penn from 2015 to 2016, although the actor's representatives contest this. It has been frequently asserted in the media that del Castillo was romantically involved with Joaquín "El Chapo" Guzmán, allegations that the actress vehemently denies.

On August 22, 2005, it was reported by the LAPD that del Castillo's new house in Los Angeles had been broken into by thieves, who took some jewelry from the actress. Del Castillo was in Los Angeles filming Bordertown, a film about the female homicides in Ciudad Juárez, when the burglary occurred. A frequent activist for a variety of causes, she posed in a 2012 PETA ad campaign encouraging pet owners to "fiercely protect" their dogs and cats by keeping them indoors. She became a citizen of the United States in September 2015 and resides in Los Angeles.

Relationship with El Chapo
On January 9, 2012, del Castillo publicly posted an essay on Twitter (using Twextra) discussing social issues in Mexico that included controversial statements directed towards Joaquín "El Chapo" Guzmán, the infamous head of the Sinaloa Cartel. The essay included requests to Mr. Guzmán to "deal with love, with good things" and to "[begin to] traffic in love." The most controversial portion of the essay stated: "Today I believe more in Chapo Guzmán [than in] the government that hides painful truths from me, that hides the cure for cancer, AIDS, etc., for their own benefit and wealth."

Unbeknownst to del Castillo, Guzmán was a longtime fan who harbored romantic feelings for her. Authorities found DVDs of La Reina del Sur at the safe house stormed during Guzmán's initial capture. Del Castillo was contacted by Guzmán's lawyer to discuss producing a biographical film about Guzmán in 2014. As a result of the meetings, she obtained the rights to his life and was unknowingly placed under CISEN surveillance. Communication increased following Guzmán's escape from prison in July 2015. She received a cell phone and the code names Hermosa and Dama from Guzmán. She brokered an interview between American actor Sean Penn and Guzmán in October 2015, shortly before Mexican Marines recaptured him (del Castillo claims in her documentary for Netflix that she did not know Penn intended to interview the drug lord during the meeting). CISEN later released photographs of del Castillo at the meetings with Guzmán's lawyer and of the arrival of the actress and Penn to Mexico.

Aftermath
Sean Penn and Del Castillo's actions remain under investigation by the Attorney General of Mexico. She was subpoenaed on January 18, 2016 and was to testify before the public prosecutor at the Mexican Consulate in Los Angeles. Del Castillo was originally under investigation for money laundering in relation to the planned movie about Guzmán and her tequila brand Honor del Castillo. The investigation was suspended in 2017 as there was no evidence that proved that Guzmán ever paid del Castillo any money.

On February 5, 2016, a Mexican judge granted del Castillo's petition for an injunction against any arrest related to the federal investigation into her ties with Joaquín Guzmán. The Mexican Attorney General issued a detain-and-interrogate order on del Castillo; however, that would only become effective if del Castillo set foot on Mexican soil. That order was issued after she did not heed a request to voluntarily appear before Mexican prosecutors.

Kate del Castillo did not return to Mexico until December 2018 and therefore since the injunction was issued in 2016 and 2017 filming locations for Ingobernable were changed to San Diego to accommodate restrictions on her travel.

The Day I Met El Chapo: The Kate del Castillo Story premiered in 2017 on Netflix, based on the events surrounding del Castillo's communications with El Chapo.

Filmography

Film

Television

Awards

References

Further reading

External links

 Kate del Castillo's Official Fan Club
 
 
 Vidas Cruzadas - Webnovela
 Tequila Honor del Castillo Official Website

Living people
20th-century Mexican actresses
21st-century Mexican actresses
20th-century American actresses
21st-century American actresses
Actresses from Los Angeles
Actresses from Mexico City
American actresses of Mexican descent
American film actresses
American stage actresses
American telenovela actresses
American television actresses
American voice actresses
Hispanic and Latino American actresses
Mexican emigrants to the United States
Mexican film actresses
Mexican stage actresses
Mexican telenovela actresses
Mexican television actresses
Mexican voice actresses
People with acquired American citizenship
Association footballers' wives and girlfriends
Year of birth missing (living people)